The startle response is an unconscious defensive response to sudden or threatening stimuli.

Startle may also refer to:

 Startle display or deimatic behaviour, any pattern of bluffing behaviour in an animal that lacks strong defences
 Startle syndrome or hyperekplexia, a rare neurologic disorder 
 Fear-potentiated startle, a reflexive physiological reaction to a presented stimulus

See also
 
 
 Startling (disambiguation)
 Startle Evoked Movement, the involuntary initiation of a planned action in response to a startling stimuli.